Steve Koppe (born 16 April 1953) is a former speedway rider from Australia.

Speedway career 
Koppe rode in the top two tiers of British Speedway from 1976 to 1980, riding for various clubs. In 1978, he became the National League Riders' Champion and was the Queensland Champion three years later in 1981.

After Speedway
Steve retired from the sport in 1989 and owned a motorcycle shop with a Suziki, Husaberg and KTM franchise.
Married to Roslyn with 5 children (and a daughter from a previous marriage), they live in Townsville North Queensland Australia. Semi-retired from the franchise, letting his sons run the business and he supports their own ventures into motorcycle racing, with some success. Eldest son, Jarrod held numerous state and national dirt track titles, including the Super Motard Queensland title. Second son, Damien, was also successful and raced for Sheffield Tigers.

References 

Living people
1953 births
Australian speedway riders
Canterbury Crusaders riders
Exeter Falcons riders
Swindon Robins riders
Sportsmen from Queensland